In the game show Minute to Win It aired on ABS-CBN, Most of the time, celebrities are invited to play in the show. Non-celebrities were also able to play in the show, but only after they passed the auditions. Special editions are also held for different age groups, and professions.

Regular episodes

Teen Challenge episodes

Junior episodes
Contestant names in bold indicate celebrities or prominent players.

Head to Head Challenge episode

Contestant names in bold indicate celebrities or prominent players.

Family and Team Challenge episodes

Contestant names in bold indicate celebrities or prominent players.

First anniversary special

Beat it to Win it winners on 60-Second Circle

Other episodes

References

Minute to Win It